is a Japanese football player for YSCC Yokohama.

Club statistics
Updated to 23 February 2018.

References

External links

Profile at YSCC Yokohama

1989 births
Living people
Kokushikan University alumni
Association football people from Kanagawa Prefecture
Japanese footballers
J3 League players
Japan Football League players
YSCC Yokohama players
Association football defenders